Bergylt is a common name that may refer to either of two species of fish:

 The Ballan wrasse, Labrus bergylta
 The Rose fish, Sebastes norvegicus